Efioanwan Ekpo (born 25 January 1984) is a Nigerian female footballer. A member of the Nigeria women's national football team, Ekpo competed at the 2003 World Cup, 2004 Summer Olympics, 2006 African Championship, 2007 World Cup and 2008 Summer Olympics.

References

1984 births
Living people
Nigerian women's footballers
Nigeria women's international footballers
2003 FIFA Women's World Cup players
2007 FIFA Women's World Cup players
Olympic footballers of Nigeria
Footballers at the 2004 Summer Olympics
Footballers at the 2008 Summer Olympics
Women's association football defenders